The 1940 SANFL Grand Final was an Australian rules football competition.   beat  100 to 79.

References 

SANFL Grand Finals
SANFL Grand Final, 1940